The Pleasant Street Historic Historic District is a historic district encompassing the historic African-American community area of Hot Springs, Arkansas.  It is located just southeast of the city's famous Bathhouse Row area, centered on a four-block stretch of Pleasant Street between Jefferson and Church Streets.  The  district includes 93 buildings, most of them residential.  The area was developed between about 1900 and 1950, with most of the development taking place after 1920.  Prominent non-residential buildings include the Visitor's Chapel A.M.E. Church at 317 Church Street, and the Woodmen of Union Building, a four-story brick building on the 500 block of Malvern Avenue.

The district was listed on the National Register of Historic Places in 2003.

See also
National Register of Historic Places listings in Garland County, Arkansas

References

Colonial Revival architecture in Arkansas
Buildings and structures completed in 1913
Buildings and structures in Hot Springs, Arkansas
Historic districts on the National Register of Historic Places in Arkansas
National Register of Historic Places in Hot Springs, Arkansas